Balkan Black Box is the only festival of culture and art in Germany which focusses on Southeastern Europe. It was established in 1999, and since then it is organised annually in Berlin. For the time of one week Balkan Black Box is presenting films, exhibitions, literature, theatre, music and discussions from and about Southeastern Europe.

Concept

The festival aims at the presentation of culture and art of the post-socialist countries of the Balkans. That is especially because these societies are still a "black box" for Western Europe. Since the establishment of the festival in 1999 the perception of Southeastern Europe changed significantly. For this reason the festival always comes up with new questions and themes that are important in the context of the actual processes in Southeastern Europe. Because of its specific and unique focus, Balkan Black Box affects the whole of Germany.

Organisation

The Festival is organised by an international team of people who are related to Southeastern Europe for biographical and/or professional reasons. Due to its open platform character the festival maintains a lot of cooperation with migrant communities and cultural institutions in Berlin as well as organisations in Southeastern Europe.

Programmes 1999–2006

1999: The role of the "opposition culture" in the Balkans
2000: "Black market culture" (Pula, Croatia) 
2001: Independent culture between market and state 
2002: "Space and time in between": Identity in changing societies 
2003: "The Balkans are different": New developments in cultural production in Southeastern Europe 
2004: "Evil Art. Cultural production and nationalism" 
2005: "turbocultures – The Balkans between the archaic period and postmodernism" 
2006: "Areas of remembering"

Film Awards "Golden Black Box"

Since 2004 the festival awards the "Golden Black Box" for each, the best feature, documentary and short film. In 2006 new categories were established additionally: "Newcomer Award" and "Human Rights Award". The competition especially promotes critical film productions in order to encourage independent coverage.

Golden Black Box winners
2004: Best Documentary – Tamara Milosevic, Cement (2003)

Background

Funding:
Balkan Black Box predominantly receives funding from cultural institutions in Berlin, but also from political foundations, Southeastern embassies and private donors.

Locations:

 Theatre Volksbühne Berlin
 Theatre Hebbel am Ufer
 Cultural Center "Pfefferberg"
 Art Centre Tacheles
 Cultural Centre "ACUD"
 Kino Babylon

Visitors:

The festival has more than 3,000 visitors every year.

External links
 Official Website

Cultural festivals in Germany
Festivals in Berlin
Balkan culture